Günter Grosswig is a retired East German slalom canoeist who competed in the mid-to-late 1950s. He won two medals in the C-2 team event at the ICF Canoe Slalom World Championships with a silver in 1955 and a bronze in 1957.

References

German male canoeists
Possibly living people
Year of birth missing (living people)
Medalists at the ICF Canoe Slalom World Championships